Westgate Bridge may refer to:

 West Gate Bridge, Melbourne, Australia
 Westgate Pedestrian and Cycle Bridge, Auckland, New Zealand
 Westgate Bridge (Topeka, Kansas), United States